Events from the year 1687 in art.

Events
 September 26 – An Ottoman Turk ammunition dump inside the Parthenon at Athens is ignited by Venetian bombardment. The resulting explosion severely damages the building and its sculptures.

Paintings

 Godfrey Kneller – The Chinese Convert
 Carlo Maratta – Madonna and Child with St. Stanislaus Kostka (Sant'Andrea al Quirinale, Rome)
 Willem van de Velde – The 'Gouden Leeuw' at the Battle of the Texel, 21 August 1673
 Alida Withoos – Pineapple (painting of the first pineapple bred in Europe; not extant)

Births
 April 13 – Sigismund Streit, German merchant and patron of the arts (died 1775)
 June 6 – Giambattista Pittoni, Italian painter of religious, historical, and mythological subjects (died 1767)
 date unknown
 Pietro Anderlini, Italian painter of the Rococo period (died 1755)
 Jean Duvivier, French medallist (died 1761)
 Egrikapili Mehmed Rasim Efendi, Ottoman calligrapher (died 1756)
 Gaetano Fanti, Italian fresco painter (died 1759)
 Thomas-Joachim Hébert, French ébéniste and furniture designer (died 1773)
 Jin Nong, Chinese painter of mei blossoms, one of the Eight Eccentrics of Yangzhou (died 1763/1764)
 Arnold Frans Rubens, Flemish Baroque painter specialized in cabinet pictures of landscapes and battle scenes (died 1719)
 Huang Shen, Chinese painter  (died 1772)
 Pieter Vanderlyn, American colonial painter (died 1778)
 Jacob van Huysum, Dutch botanical artist (died 1740)

Deaths
 February 3 – Bernhard Keil, Danish painter (born 1624)
 June – Juriaen van Streeck, Dutch Golden Age painter (born 1632)
 September 10 – Willem Wissing, Dutch portrait artist (born 1656)
 October 18 – Pietro Liberi, Italian painter nicknamed il Libertino (born 1605)
 November 18 – Anton Janson, Dutch typographer and printmaker (born 1620)
 date unknown
 Samuel Bernard, French miniature painter and engraver (born 1615)
 Giacomo di Castro, Italian painter (born 1624)
 François Collignon, French engraver, print-seller and publisher (born 1609)
 Angelo Michele Colonna, Italian painter of frescoes (born 1604)
 Nicolas Frémery, French sculptor (date of birth unknown)
 Simon de Leal Leon, Spanish painter (born 1610)
 Marco Liberi, Italian painter of mythologic and historic cabinet paintings (born 1640)
 Hubertus Quellinus, Flemish Baroque engraver (born 1619)
 Francesco Rosa, Italian painter (date of birth unknown)

 
Years of the 17th century in art
1680s in art